Oranges & Lemons is a Japanese band formed by a duo of music composers and performers, Masumi Itō and Yōko Ueno. The duo is most notable for performing the opening theme ("Soramimi Cake"), and closing theme ("Raspberry Heaven") to the anime television series Azumanga Daioh.

Itō and Ueno, still under the title of 'Oranges & Lemons' also performed the album Tribute to Azumanga Daioh in which they sang multiple songs based on the music from the series. This album is notable because it not only contains an alternate 'softer' version of "Soramimi Cake" (Cake of Mishearing) but also an a cappella version of "Raspberry Heaven".

Itō and Ueno also sing  together, the ending theme to the anime Scrapped Princess, although not under the band name Oranges & Lemons.

External links 
 
 

Azumanga Daioh
Japanese pop music groups
Japanese musical duos